Queuosine is a modified nucleoside that is present in certain tRNAs in bacteria and eukaryotes. It contains the nucleobase queuine. Originally identified in E. coli, queuosine was found to occupy the first anticodon position of tRNAs for histidine, aspartic acid, asparagine and tyrosine.  The first anticodon position pairs with the third "wobble" position in codons, and queuosine improves accuracy of translation compared to guanosine.  Synthesis of queuosine begins with GTP.  In bacteria, three structurally unrelated classes of riboswitch are known to regulate genes that are involved in the synthesis or transport of pre-queuosine1, a precursor to queuosine: PreQ1-I riboswitches, PreQ1-II riboswitches and PreQ1-III riboswitches.

Queuosine biosynthesis genes have also been found on phage genomes and may be involved in protection from genome degradation by the host.

References

External links
 Wikigenes: Queuosine
 Human Metabolome Database: Queuosine (HMDB11596)
 

Nucleosides
Pyrrolopyrimidines
Tetrahydrofurans
Cyclopentenes
Hydroxymethyl compounds